Phornphirun Philawan (born 8 April 1999) is a Thailand professional footballer who plays as a defender for Japanese club Mynavi Sendai Ladies and the Thailand national team.

She participated in the 2017 AFC U-19 Women's Championship. She was selected for the 2019 FIFA Women's World Cup.

Honours 
Individual

 Thai Women's League MVP Award: 2022

References

External links

1999 births
Living people
Women's association football defenders
WE League players
Mynavi Vegalta Sendai Ladies players
Phornphirun Philawan
Phornphirun Philawan
2019 FIFA Women's World Cup players
Phornphirun Philawan